Festklänge, S. 101, is the seventh symphonic poem by Franz Liszt. Written in 1853 during Liszt's time in Weimar, it was first performed on 9 November 1854 and was published in 1857. The German title means "festive sounds", and Liszt had intended the piece to be played at his wedding to Princess Carolyne zu Sayn-Wittgenstein.

References

External links
 

Symphonic poems by Franz Liszt
1853 compositions